Sweetgrass 113 is an Indian reserve of the Sweetgrass First Nation in Saskatchewan. It is 26 kilometres west of North Battleford. In the 2016 Canadian Census, it recorded a population of 643 living in 169 of its 181 total private dwellings. In the same year, its Community Well-Being index was calculated at 55 of 100, compared to 58.4 for the average First Nations community and 77.5 for the average non-Indigenous community.

References

Indian reserves in Saskatchewan
Division No. 16, Saskatchewan